Alain Damasio (born Alain Raymond, 1 August 1969) is a French writer of sci-fi and fantasy. He also works as a scriptwriter for comics, radio fictions, movie and TV series. He is also notable as an audio and spoken word artist.

Biography 

Alain Damasio was born in Lyon. His father was a self-employed car body repairperson, while his mother was agrégée (a high-level academic achievement) in English. Alain Damasio graduated from high school with a specialization in science. He then passed the entrance exam for ESSEC Business School, one of France's top business schools, that he left in 1991 without graduating. He then embarked on two solitary retreats to write, residing first in Vercors (France) and then in Nonza (Corsica, France). His works have focused heavily on futuristic politics and incorporate significant science fiction and fantasy elements.

As a young man he wrote many short stories. His first longform fictional work was La Zone du Dehors (The Outer Zone), a futuristic novel dealing with a model of society under control on a democratic model (inspired by the works of Michel Foucault and Gilles Deleuze).

His second novel was rewarded with the Grand Prize of Imaginary Writing in 2006, in the works of fiction category: La Horde du Contrevent (The WindWalkers). This novel comes with a soundtrack composed by Arno Alyvan. It was a great success and sold 120,000 copies; this book is regularly quoted as a must-read of French fantasy books.

In 2008, he lends his voice to Bora, a piece of music by Rone.
In 2009, he wrote La Rage du Sage (The Wise Man Wrath or Sage Rage), a poetic and political essay on our times, for the free single of the group Sliver.
Alain Damasio also writes the script of WindWalkers, an animation film taken from La Horde du Contrevent with Jan Kounen as director and Marc Caro as art director.

In 2019, he published Les Furtifs (The Stealthies), his most recent novel. In collaboration with the composer Yan Péchin, he has developed a musical environment based on this novel in an album called Entrer dans la couleur.

Works

Collected short stories 
 Aucun Souvenir Assez Solide (No Strong Memories) La Volte, 2012

Short stories 
 Les Aiguilleurs du ciel (Air Traffic Controllers), in Onze pour Mille (One out of a Thousand), Cylibris, 2000
 El Levir et le Livre (El Koob and the book) in Libelle, pub. In DESS of the Sorbonne, 2001
 Les Hauts Parleurs,( The Loud Speakers) in( Another globalization in progress, Mango(Regard sur demain), 2002 ( with Karen Bastien et Philippe Arnaud)
 Aucun souvenir assez solide, in Galaxies, n°  38, 2005
 So phare away, in Galaxies, n°42, 2007
 Le Bruit des bagues,(The Ringing rings) in L'Expansion, n° 723, 2007
 Définitivement, (Definitely)in Appel d'air, Les Trois souhaits, 2007
 Disparitions, in Apple d'air, Les Trois Souhaits, 2007
 Dual universe, 2016

Novels 
 La Zone du Dehors (The Outer Zone),Cylibris, 1999
 La Horde du Contrevent (The WindWalkers), La Volte, 2004(Folio SF, 2007 paperback)
 La Zone du Dehors, new version, La Volte, 2007 (Folio SF, 2009 paperback)
 Les Furtifs (The Stealthies), La Volte, 2019

Other written works 
 Sociétés de contrôle et cinéma,(societies under control and cinema), on the site of La Zone du Dehors
 Appel d'air contre la narcose Sarkozy (An In- draught against Sarkozy narcosis) on the site of La Zone du dehors, 2007
 La Rage du sage (TheWiseman Wrath) in Memento Mori, 2009 (with SLIVER)
 Words of the song Bora, for the artist Rone

Video games 

Alain Damasio is co-founder of Dontnod Entertainment (2008) with Aleksi Briclot, Hervé  Bonin, Jean Maxime Moris and Oscar Guilbert. He was director of the narrative department from 2008 to 2010, then he commits this job to Stéphane Beauverger to dedicate himself to his next projects Les Furtifs and Fusion.  He has written the first two narrative bibles of the AAA game Remember Me (narrative universe, themes and characters’ profile) before  directing a writing workshop of seven people so as to complete the bible of a thousand pages and the first version of the script. Remember Me was published in June 2013 and had sold 2.1 million copies.
Remember Me was awarded the prize of the best script at the Paris Games Awards.

In 2022, Alain Damasio is also one of the six writers of Cross The Ages : The Chrome Spell Book. Those books are the spine of the digital collectible card game Cross The Ages: TCG.

Audio creations 

Alain Damasio is particularly interested in the music of words and in the potentialities of sound as language. He worked repeatedly on sound versions of his texts but also created a soundwalk: La Sansouïre.

 The Chrones, audio adaptation of several texts from La Horde du Contrevent (The Wind Walkers) (Voice : Alain Damasio - Radio adaptation: Floriane Pochon, with Tony Regnauld) which was rewarded with le Prix du Coup de Cœur du Jury( The jury's favourite) at the Radiophonies Festival 2012.
 La Sansouïre (from the unpublished text by Alain Damasio - adapted for the radio by Floriane Pochon and Tony Regnauld). An audio walk on Napoleon beach at Port-St-Louis-du-Rhône, created when Alain Damasio was the guest of Radio Grenouille for Marseille-Provence in 2013.
 Since September 2013 Alain Damasio has been lending his voice and his pen for several jingles on the web radio Phaune Radio.
 In 2014, Alain Damasio starts the Phonophore with sound directors Floriane Pochon and Tony Regnauld, an audio version of his fiction Les Furtifs (The Stealthies), a composition of 42 audio items (portraits and sonorous landscapes, political cartridges, docu fictions...) the project was awarded a grant by the foundation Beaumarchais-Orange in May 2014.
 Fragments Hackés d'un futur qui résiste (Hacked fragments of a tough future) is a piece which was originally created for the 2014 version of the Festival des Libertés (Festival of Freedoms) at the National Theatre in Brussels (Belgium) from a scenario by Alain Damasio and audio accompaniment by the studio of art sounds Tarabust and Phaune Radio.
In 2021, he created a "slam" (a musical poem) in support of the "ZAD de la colline" on the music of Laurent Pernice.

Collaborations 

 In 2008, Rone uses Alain Damasio's voice for his Bora ( in Bora EP, In Finé/Discograph, minimal techno genre. It consists in extracts from Alain Damasio's diary when he was working on La Horde du Contrevent  .
 In 2009, he wrote La Rage du Sage for the free single Memento Mori, by the group SLIVER (Winged Skull Records/we are all liars records). 
 In 2011, he appears in an on-line documentary INSITU by Antoine Viviani, the clip was shot in the area of La Défense in Paris, and he talked about how he relates to urban space. His voice resounds in the commercial mall of Les Quatre Temps, then he alludes to his work in les Clameurs (Clamours) in La Zone du Dehors (The Outer Zone).
In 2020 he participates in the french documentary Un pays qui se tient sage about police violence and the handling of the "Gilets Jaunes" movement

Conferences 

 In 2009, Alain Damasio gave an hour's lecture on L'homme qui prenait sa femme pour un clavier ou l'anthropotechnique  à l'épreuve de la pire des science-fictions (The man who took his wife for a keyboard or anthropotechnology put to the test of the worst sci-fi : when it starts asking questions) about the interaction man – machine during the meeting IHM 2009, a conference in French on the interaction man- machine.
 Conférence Convention 2010 : Societies under control and Liberty.
 In 2010 he is a guest at the Festival of fantasy Worlds Les Imaginales in Epinal where he lectured about his work as a writer
 In 2012 Alain Damasio takes part in several conferences organized by the Festival de L'Imaginaire Grenoblois Rêves d'Ailleurs (Grenoble Fantasy festival, Dreams from Abroad) (http://lesrevailleurs.fr) in Grenoble on the following themes : Dystopies et nouvelles technologies et Invasion, le zombie comme figure de l'Autre. Dystopias and new technologies and Invasion, the zombie as the Other One.
 Since 2010 he has been a regular guest in Nantes for the Utopiales where he took part in numerous conferences. In 2010 : Les Réseaux, un monde sans frontières ? ( The Networks, a world without borders ?) and Nanotechnologies at the limit point of the infinitesimally small. In 2012, De l'écriture au scénario ( from novel writing to scenario writing), Science-fiction et jeu vidéo, (scifi-and video game), Une technologie de l'invisible (Technology of the invisible)  . In 2013, Citoyens du futur (Citizens of the future), Interface cerveau- machine (Interface brain- machine) and a conference :Philosophie et jeu video (Philosophy and video games).
 In 2014, Alain Damasio lectured at TEDx Paris at the Châtelet Theâtre in Paris "Très Humain plutôt que transhumain ?" ("Very Human rather than Transhuman")
 
Soundtracks and videos of his numerous conferences are available on the ActuSF website.

Literary prizes 

 Special Elbakin prize 2014 for "  La Horde du Contrevent " 
 Grand Prix de l'Imaginaire in the French novel category (Grand Prize for Fantasy) for La Horde du Contrevent 2006
 Prix Imaginales des lycées(High school students prize) 2006 for La Horde du Contrevent
 European Utopiales Prize 2007 for La Zone du dehors (The Outer Zone ).

Other prizes 

 SACD (French authors organization) prize for digital Creation 2014 for Remember Me and the whole of his digital creation

La Volte 

 Alain Damasio's book have the distinctive feature of not being just books but books and objects : one edition of The Outer Zone comes with a DVD of a short film, animations in 3D and other bonuses to enhance one's reading experience ; La Horde du Contrevent (The wind walkers) comes with A BOL (a book sound track) composed by musician Arno Alyvan.
 There also exists a special prestige edition of La Horde du Contrevent, signed and numbered which with the sound track, a DVD featuring unreleased interviews of the author, recorded by his brother, film director Bruno Raymond-Damasio (however the paperback edition is sold with no soundtrack)

Bibliography 

 Olivier Noël, Alain Damasio, le Vif du sujet (The heart of the matter ), in Galaxies, n° 42, 2007.
 Stéphane Martin, Colin Pahlish, La croisée des souffles, La Horde du Contrevent d'Alain Damasio (Crossroads of breaths, The wind walkers) in Archipel Essais, n° 18 Lausanne, 2013.

Decorations 
 Chevalier of the Order of Arts and Letters (2016)

References

1969 births
Living people
French science fiction writers
Writers from Lyon
French fantasy writers
21st-century French novelists
Chevaliers of the Ordre des Arts et des Lettres